Agostinho is a Portuguese language noun meaning Augustine. It may be used as a given name or a surname. People with the name include:

 Agostinho (footballer) (born 1975), Portuguese footballer, full name Joaquim Agostinho da Silva Ribeiro
 Agostinho da Silva (1906–1994), Portuguese philosopher, essayist and writer
 Agostinho Neto (1922–1979), first President of Angola
 José Agostinho de Macedo (1761–1831), Portuguese poet and prose writer
 Fernando Agostinho da Costa (born 1981), known as "Xara", Angolan footballer
 Renato Agostinho de Oliveira Júnior (born 1981), Brazilian footballer
 Artur Agostinho (1920–2011), Portuguese journalist
 Gílson Domingos Rezende Agostinho (born 1977), known as "Gilsinho", Brazilian footballer
 Joaquim Agostinho (1942–1984), Portuguese professional bicycle racer
 José Maria de Santo Agostinho (1889–1912), Brazilian mystic
 Pedro Agostinho (born 1965), Portuguese athlete who participated at the 1988 and 1992 Summer Olympics

See also
Cabo de Santo Agostinho, "Cape of Saint Augustine", 35 km south of Recife, Pernambuco, Brazil
Troféu Joaquim Agostinho, a road bicycle racing stage race held annually in the Torres Vedras, Portugal
Santo Agostinho River, located in Espírito Santo, Brazil

Portuguese masculine given names
Portuguese-language surnames